Ellison Ridge is an unincorporated community in Summers County, West Virginia, United States. Ellison Ridge is southwest of Hinton and southeast of Beckley.

Ellison Ridge is close to where the settlement of Lilly once stood before, which was abandoned when the Bluestone Dam project began. Ellison Ridge has a parking lot allowing access to the convergence of the Little Bluestone River and the Bluestone River. A pedestrian bridge across the Little Bluestone River which allows access to the footpath through Bluestone State Park.

References

Unincorporated communities in Summers County, West Virginia
Unincorporated communities in West Virginia